Rhode Island is the 17th-wealthiest state in the United States of America, with a per capita income of $21,688 (2000) and a personal per capita income of $31,916 (2003). Its median household income is $42,090 (2000), ranked seventeenth in the country, and its median family income is $52,781 (2000), the seventeenth-highest in the country. The median value of an owner-occupied housing unit is $133,000 (2000), ranked fifteenth in the country.

The city of Newport was known for its wealth in the 20th century. However, the actual town of Newport is not as wealthy as many think: its median household income is only a mere $40,669, actually below the national median (and only the forty-second-highest in the state). Despite this, the town is home to many large estates and is a popular summer home location for the wealthy. Jamestown, located west of Newport, is actually the richest community in the state. Other notable affluent areas include Barrington and East and West Greenwich. Besides these areas, Rhode Island is mostly a middle-income state, as a majority of the population lives in the urban city Providence. 69% of Rhode Island places do however have per capita incomes higher than the national average, one of the highest percentages of any state, but 11.9% of the population lives below the poverty line.

1.9% percent of Rhode Island households have annual incomes of $200,000+, and 11.4% have incomes of $100,000 or more. On the contrary, 10.7% have incomes of less than $10,000 and 42.0% less than $34,999.

Rhode Island counties ranked by per capita income

Note: Data is from the 2010 United States Census Data and the 2006-2010 American Community Survey 5-Year Estimates.

Rhode Island places ranked by per capita income

References

External links

Rhode Island
Income
income